Anapisa is a genus of moths in the family Erebidae described by Sergius G. Kiriakoff in 1952.

Species
 Anapisa cleta (Plötz, 1880)
 Anapisa connexa (Walker, 1854)
 Anapisa crenophylax (Holland, 1893)
 Anapisa dufranei Kiriakoff, 1952
 Anapisa endoxantha Hampson, 1914
 Anapisa histrio (Kiriakoff, 1953)
 Anapisa holobrunnea Tams, 1932
 Anapisa lamborni (Rothschild, 1913)
 Anapisa melaleuca Holland, 1898
 Anapisa metarctioides (Hampson, 1907)
 Anapisa monotica Holland, 1893
 Anapisa monotonia Kiriakoff, 1963
 Anapisa preussi Gaede, 1926
 Anapisa schoutedeni Kiriakoff, 1952
 Anapisa sjoestedti (Aurivillius, 1904)
 Anapisa tristigma (Mabille, 1893)
 Anapisa vanoyei Kiriakoff, 1952

References

Syntomini
Moth genera